The 84th United States Congress was a meeting of the legislative branch of the United States federal government, composed of the United States Senate and the United States House of Representatives. It met in Washington, D.C. from January 3, 1955, to January 3, 1957, during the third and fourth years of Dwight D. Eisenhower's presidency. The apportionment of seats in the House of Representatives was based on the 1950 United States census.

The Democratic Party won back majorities in both the House and Senate, thus giving them full control of Congress, although Republican Party won the Senate in the last Congress.

Major events

 January 28, 1955: Congress authorized the President to use force to protect Taiwan from the People's Republic of China
 February 10, 1955: The United States Navy helped the Republic of China evacuate Chinese Nationalist army and residents from the Tachen Islands to Taiwan.
 February 12, 1955: President Eisenhower sent the first U.S. advisers to South Vietnam.
 July 2, 1955:  Senator Lyndon Johnson, Majority Leader of the United States Senate, suffered a major heart attack.
 September 24, 1955: President Eisenhower suffered a coronary thrombosis.
 November 5, 1955: Racial segregation was forbidden on trains and buses in U.S. interstate commerce.
 December 1, 1955: Rosa Parks was arrested for refusing to give up her seat on the bus to a white person.
 December 5, 1955: The American Federation of Labor and the Congress of Industrial Organizations merged to become the AFL–CIO.
 March 12, 1956: 96 Congressmen signed the Southern Manifesto, a protest against the 1954 Supreme Court ruling (Brown v. Board of Education) desegregating public education.
 November 6, 1956: United States elections, 1956:
 1956 United States presidential election: Republican incumbent Dwight D. Eisenhower defeated Democratic challenger Adlai E. Stevenson in a rematch of their contest four years earlier.
 United States Senate elections, 1956: The party balance of the chamber remained unchanged as Republican and Democratic gains cancelled each other.
 United States House of Representatives elections, 1956: Republicans lost a net of two seats to the majority Democrats.

Major legislation

 January 29, 1955: Formosa Resolution
 March 31, 1955: Career Incentive Act
 June 28, 1955: Flood Control and Coastal Emergency Act, 
 July 11, 1955: To provide that all United States currency shall bear the inscription "In God We Trust", 
 July 14, 1955: Air Pollution Control Act, ch. 360, 
 July 23, 1955: Multiple Surface Use Mining Act, ch. 730, 
 August 9, 1955: Reserve Forces Act, 
 August 11, 1955: National Housing Act ("Capehart Act"), 
 August 12, 1955: Poliomyelitis Vaccination Assistance Act, ch. 863, 
 April 11, 1956: Colorado River Storage Project Act,  
 June 29, 1956: Federal-Aid Highway Act of 1956, (National Interstate and Defense Highways Act), 
 July 30, 1956: Health Research Facilities Act, ch. 779, 
 August 8, 1956: Fish and Wildlife Act of 1956, ch. 1036,

Party summary
The count below identifies party affiliations at the beginning of the first session of this Congress, and includes members from vacancies and newly admitted states, when they were first seated. Changes resulting from subsequent replacements are shown below in the "Changes in membership" section.

Senate

House of Representatives

Leadership

Senate 

  President: Richard Nixon (R)
 President pro tempore: Walter F. George (D)

Majority (Democratic) leadership 
Majority Leader and Democratic Conference chairman: Lyndon B. Johnson
 Majority Whip: Earle Clements
 Democratic Caucus Secretary: Thomas C. Hennings Jr.

Minority (Republican) leadership 
 Minority Leader: William Knowland
 Minority Whip: Leverett Saltonstall
 Republican Conference chairman: Eugene Millikin
 Republican Conference Secretary: Milton Young
 National Senatorial Committee Chair: Barry Goldwater
 Policy Committee Chairman: Styles Bridges

House of Representatives 

 Speaker: Sam Rayburn (D)

Majority (Democratic) leadership 
 Majority Leader: John W. McCormack
 Majority Whip: Carl Albert
 Democratic Caucus chairman: John J. Rooney
 Democratic Caucus Secretary: Edna F. Kelly
 Democratic Campaign Committee Chairman: Michael J. Kirwan

Minority (Republican) leadership 
 Minority Leader: Joseph W. Martin Jr.
 Minority Whip: Leslie C. Arends
 Republican Conference chairman: Clifford R. Hope
 Policy Committee Chairman: Joseph W. Martin Jr.
 Republican Campaign Committee Chairman: Richard M. Simpson

Caucuses
 House Democratic Caucus
 Senate Democratic Caucus

Members
This list is arranged by chamber, then by state.

Senate
Senators are popularly elected statewide every two years, with one-third beginning new six-year terms with each Congress. Preceding the names in the list below are Senate class numbers, which indicate the cycle of their election. In this Congress, Class 1 meant their term began in the last Congress, facing re-election in 1958; Class 2 meant their term began with this Congress, facing re-election in 1960; and Class 3 meant their term ended with this Congress, facing re-election in 1956.

Alabama 
 2. John Sparkman (D)
 3. J. Lister Hill (D)

Arizona 
 1. Barry Goldwater (R)
 3. Carl Hayden (D)

Arkansas 
 2. John L. McClellan (D)
 3. J. William Fulbright (D)

California 
 1. William Knowland (R)
 3. Thomas Kuchel (R)

Colorado 
 2. Gordon Allott (R)
 3. Eugene Millikin (R)

Connecticut 
 1. William A. Purtell (R)
 3. Prescott Bush (R)

Delaware 
 1. John J. Williams (R)
 2. J. Allen Frear Jr. (D)

Florida 
 1. Spessard Holland (D)
 3. George Smathers (D)

Georgia 
 2. Richard Russell Jr. (D)
 3. Walter F. George (D)

Idaho 
 2. Henry Dworshak (R)
 3. Herman Welker (R)

Illinois 
 2. Paul Douglas (D)
 3. Everett Dirksen (R)

Indiana 
 1. William E. Jenner (R)
 3. Homer E. Capehart (R)

Iowa 
 2. Thomas E. Martin (R)
 3. Bourke B. Hickenlooper (R)

Kansas 
 2. Andrew Frank Schoeppel (R)
 3. Frank Carlson (R)

Kentucky 
 2. Alben W. Barkley (D), until April 30, 1956
 Robert Humphreys (D), June 21, 1956 – November 6, 1956
 John Sherman Cooper (R), from November 7, 1956
 3. Earle Clements (D)

Louisiana 
 2. Allen J. Ellender (D)
 3. Russell B. Long (D)

Maine 
 1. Frederick G. Payne (R)
 2. Margaret Chase Smith (R)

Maryland 
 1. James Glenn Beall (R)
 3. John Marshall Butler (R)

Massachusetts 
 1. John F. Kennedy (D)
 2. Leverett Saltonstall (R)

Michigan 
 1. Charles E. Potter (R)
 2. Patrick V. McNamara (D)

Minnesota 
 1. Edward John Thye (R)
 2. Hubert Humphrey (DFL)

Mississippi 
 1. John C. Stennis (D)
 2. James Eastland (D)

Missouri 
 1. Stuart Symington (D)
 3. Thomas C. Hennings Jr. (D)

Montana 
 1. Mike Mansfield (D)
 2. James E. Murray (D)

Nebraska 
 1. Roman Hruska (R)
 2. Carl Curtis (R)

Nevada 
 1. George W. Malone (R)
 3. Alan Bible (D)

New Hampshire 
 2. Styles Bridges (R)
 3. Norris Cotton (R)

New Jersey 
 1. Howard Alexander Smith (R)
 2. Clifford P. Case (R)

New Mexico 
 1. Dennis Chávez (D)
 2. Clinton Anderson (D)

New York 
 1. Irving Ives (R)
 3. Herbert H. Lehman (D)

North Carolina 
 2. W. Kerr Scott (D)
 3. Sam Ervin (D)

North Dakota 
 1. William Langer (R-NPL)
 3. Milton Young (R)

Ohio 
 1. John W. Bricker (R)
 3. George H. Bender (R)

Oklahoma 
 2. Robert S. Kerr (D)
 3. Mike Monroney (D)

Oregon 
 2. Richard L. Neuberger (D)
 3. Wayne Morse (I), changed to (D) April 30, 1955

Pennsylvania 
 1. Edward Martin (R)
 3. James H. Duff (R)

Rhode Island 
 1. John Pastore (D)
 2. Theodore F. Green (D)

South Carolina 
 2. Strom Thurmond (D), until April 4, 1956
 Thomas A. Wofford (D), April 5, 1956 – November 6, 1956
 Strom Thurmond (D), from November 7, 1956
 3. Olin D. Johnston (D)

South Dakota 
 2. Karl E. Mundt (R)
 3. Francis H. Case (R)

Tennessee 
 1. Albert Gore Sr. (D)
 2. Estes Kefauver (D)

Texas 
 1. Price Daniel (D)
 2. Lyndon B. Johnson (D)

Utah 
 1. Arthur Vivian Watkins (R)
 3. Wallace F. Bennett (R)

Vermont 
 1. Ralph Flanders (R)
 3. George Aiken (R)

Virginia 
 1. Harry F. Byrd (D)
 2. Absalom Willis Robertson (D)

Washington 
 1. Henry M. Jackson (D)
 3. Warren Magnuson (D)

West Virginia 
 1. Harley M. Kilgore (D), until February 28, 1956
 William Laird III (D), March 13, 1956 – November 6, 1956
 Chapman Revercomb (R), from November 7, 1956
 2. Matthew M. Neely (D)

Wisconsin 
 1. Joseph McCarthy (R)
 3. Alexander Wiley (R)

Wyoming 
 1. Frank A. Barrett (R)
 2. Joseph C. O'Mahoney (D)

House of Representatives
The names of members of the House of Representatives are preceded by their district numbers.

Alabama 
 . Frank W. Boykin (D)
 . George M. Grant (D)
 . George W. Andrews (D)
 . Kenneth A. Roberts (D)
 . Albert Rains (D)
 . Armistead I. Selden Jr. (D)
 . Carl Elliott (D)
 . Robert E. Jones Jr. (D)
 . George Huddleston Jr. (D)

Arizona 
 . John Jacob Rhodes (R)
 . Stewart Udall (D)

Arkansas 
 . Ezekiel C. Gathings (D)
 . Wilbur Mills (D)
 . James William Trimble (D)
 . Oren Harris (D)
 . Brooks Hays (D)
 . William F. Norrell (D)

California 
 . Hubert B. Scudder (R)
 . Clair Engle (D)
 . John E. Moss (D)
 . William S. Mailliard (R)
 . John F. Shelley (D)
 . John F. Baldwin Jr. (R)
 . John J. Allen Jr. (R)
 . George P. Miller (D)
 . J. Arthur Younger (R)
 . Charles Gubser (R)
 . J. Leroy Johnson (R)
 . B. F. Sisk (D)
 . Charles M. Teague (R)
 . Harlan Hagen (D)
 . Gordon L. McDonough (R)
 . Donald L. Jackson (R)
 . Cecil R. King (D)
 . Craig Hosmer (R)
 . Chester E. Holifield (D)
 . John Carl Hinshaw (R), until August 5, 1956
 . Edgar W. Hiestand (R)
 . Joseph F. Holt (R)
 . Clyde Doyle (D)
 . Glenard P. Lipscomb (R)
 . Patrick J. Hillings (R)
 . James Roosevelt (D)
 . Harry R. Sheppard (D)
 . James B. Utt (R)
 . John R. Phillips (R)
 . Bob Wilson (R)

Colorado 
 . Byron G. Rogers (D)
 . William S. Hill (R)
 . John Chenoweth (R)
 . Wayne N. Aspinall (D)

Connecticut 
 . Antoni Sadlak (R)
 . Thomas J. Dodd (D)
 . Horace Seely-Brown Jr. (R)
 . Albert W. Cretella (R)
 . Albert P. Morano (R)
 . James T. Patterson (R)

Delaware 
 . Harris McDowell (D)

Florida 
 . William C. Cramer (R)
 . Charles E. Bennett (D)
 . Bob Sikes (D)
 . Dante Fascell (D)
 . Syd Herlong (D)
 . Paul Rogers (D), from January 11, 1955
 . James A. Haley (D)
 . Donald Ray Matthews (D)

Georgia 
 . Prince Hulon Preston Jr. (D)
 . J. L. Pilcher (D)
 . Tic Forrester (D)
 . John Flynt (D)
 . James C. Davis (D)
 . Carl Vinson (D)
 . Henderson Lovelace Lanham (D)
 . Iris Faircloth Blitch (D)
 . Phillip M. Landrum (D)
 . Paul Brown (D)

Idaho 
 . Gracie Pfost (D)
 . Hamer H. Budge (R)

Illinois 
 . William L. Dawson (D)
 . Barratt O'Hara (D)
 . James C. Murray (D)
 . William E. McVey (R)
 . John C. Kluczynski (D)
 . Thomas J. O'Brien (D)
 . James B. Bowler (D)
 . Thomas S. Gordon (D)
 . Sidney R. Yates (D)
 . Richard W. Hoffman (R)
 . Timothy P. Sheehan (R)
 . Charles A. Boyle (D)
 . Marguerite S. Church (R)
 . Chauncey W. Reed (R), until February 9, 1956
 . Noah M. Mason (R)
 . Leo E. Allen (R)
 . Leslie C. Arends (R)
 . Harold H. Velde (R)
 . Robert B. Chiperfield (R)
 . Sid Simpson (R)
 . Peter F. Mack Jr. (D)
 . William L. Springer (R)
 . Charles W. Vursell (R)
 . Melvin Price (D)
 . Kenneth J. Gray (D)

Indiana 
 . Ray Madden (D)
 . Charles A. Halleck (R)
 . Shepard J. Crumpacker Jr. (R)
 . E. Ross Adair (R)
 . John V. Beamer (R)
 . Cecil M. Harden (R)
 . William G. Bray (R)
 . Winfield K. Denton (D)
 . Earl Wilson (R)
 . Ralph Harvey (R)
 . Charles B. Brownson (R)

Iowa 
 . Fred Schwengel (R)
 . Henry O. Talle (R)
 . H. R. Gross (R)
 . Karl M. LeCompte (R)
 . Paul Cunningham (R)
 . James I. Dolliver (R)
 . Ben F. Jensen (R)
 . Charles B. Hoeven (R)

Kansas 
 . William H. Avery (R)
 . Errett P. Scrivner (R)
 . Myron V. George (R)
 . Edward Herbert Rees (R)
 . Clifford R. Hope (R)
 . Wint Smith (R)

Kentucky 
 . Noble Jones Gregory (D)
 . William Natcher (D)
 . John M. Robsion Jr. (R)
 . Frank Chelf (D)
 . Brent Spence (D)
 . John C. Watts (D)
 . Carl D. Perkins (D)
 . Eugene Siler (R)

Louisiana 
 . F. Edward Hébert (D)
 . Hale Boggs (D)
 . Edwin E. Willis (D)
 . Overton Brooks (D)
 . Otto Passman (D)
 . James H. Morrison (D)
 . T. Ashton Thompson (D)
 . George S. Long (D)

Maine 
 . Robert Hale (R)
 . Charles P. Nelson (R)
 . Clifford McIntire (R)

Maryland 
 . Edward Tylor Miller (R)
 . James Devereux (R)
 . Edward Garmatz (D)
 . George Hyde Fallon (D)
 . Richard Lankford (D)
 . DeWitt Hyde (R)
 . Samuel Friedel (D)

Massachusetts 
 . John W. Heselton (R)
 . Edward Boland (D)
 . Philip J. Philbin (D)
 . Harold Donohue (D)
 . Edith Nourse Rogers (R)
 . William H. Bates (R)
 . Thomas J. Lane (D)
 . Torbert Macdonald (D)
 . Donald W. Nicholson (R)
 . Laurence Curtis (R)
 . Tip O'Neill (D)
 . John W. McCormack (D)
 . Richard B. Wigglesworth (R)
 . Joseph W. Martin Jr. (R)

Michigan 
 . Thaddeus M. Machrowicz (D)
 . George Meader (R)
 . August E. Johansen (R)
 . Clare Hoffman (R)
 . Gerald Ford (R)
 . Donald Hayworth (D)
 . Jesse P. Wolcott (R)
 . Alvin Morell Bentley (R)
 . Ruth Thompson (R)
 . Elford Albin Cederberg (R)
 . Victor A. Knox (R)
 . John B. Bennett (R)
 . Charles Diggs (D)
 . Louis C. Rabaut (D)
 . John Dingell Sr. (D), until September 19, 1955
 John Dingell (D), from December 13, 1955
 . John Lesinski Jr. (D)
 . Martha Griffiths (D)
 . George Anthony Dondero (R)

Minnesota 
 . August H. Andresen (R)
 . Joseph P. O'Hara (R)
 . Roy Wier (DFL)
 . Eugene McCarthy (DFL)
 . Walter Judd (R)
 . Fred Marshall (DFL)
 . Herman Carl Andersen (R)
 . John Blatnik (DFL)
 . Coya Knutson (DFL)

Mississippi 
 . Thomas Abernethy (D)
 . Jamie Whitten (D)
 . Frank Ellis Smith (D)
 . John Bell Williams (D)
 . W. Arthur Winstead (D)
 . William M. Colmer (D)

Missouri 
 . Frank M. Karsten (D)
 . Thomas B. Curtis (R)
 . Leonor Sullivan (D)
 . George H. Christopher (D)
 . Richard Walker Bolling (D)
 . William Raleigh Hull Jr. (D)
 . Dewey Jackson Short (R)
 . A. S. J. Carnahan (D)
 . Clarence Cannon (D)
 . Paul C. Jones (D)
 . Morgan M. Moulder (D)

Montana 
 . Lee Metcalf (D)
 . Orvin B. Fjare (R)

Nebraska 
 . Phillip Hart Weaver (R)
 . Jackson B. Chase (R)
 . Robert Dinsmore Harrison (R)
 . Arthur L. Miller (R)

Nevada 
 . Clarence Clifton Young (R)

New Hampshire 
 . Chester Earl Merrow (R)
 . Perkins Bass (R)

New Jersey 
 . Charles A. Wolverton (R)
 . T. Millet Hand (R), until December 26, 1956
 . James C. Auchincloss (R)
 . Frank Thompson (D)
 . Peter Frelinghuysen Jr. (R)
 . Harrison A. Williams (D)
 . William B. Widnall (R)
 . Gordon Canfield (R)
 . Frank C. Osmers Jr. (R)
 . Peter W. Rodino (D)
 . Hugh Joseph Addonizio (D)
 . Robert Kean (R)
 . Alfred Dennis Sieminski (D)
 . T. James Tumulty (D)

New Mexico 
Both representatives were elected statewide on a general ticket.
 . Antonio M. Fernández (D), until November 7, 1956
 . John J. Dempsey (D)

New York 
 . Stuyvesant Wainwright (R)
 . Steven Derounian (R)
 . Frank J. Becker (R)
 . Henry J. Latham (R)
 . Albert H. Bosch (R)
 . Lester Holtzman (D)
 . James J. Delaney (D)
 . Victor Anfuso (D)
 . Eugene James Keogh (D)
 . Edna F. Kelly (D)
 . Emanuel Celler (D)
 . Francis E. Dorn (R)
 . Abraham J. Multer (D)
 . John J. Rooney (D)
 . John H. Ray (R)
 . Adam Clayton Powell Jr. (D)
 . Frederic René Coudert Jr. (R)
 . James G. Donovan (D)
 . Arthur George Klein (D), until December 31, 1956
 . Irwin D. Davidson (D-L), until December 31, 1956
 . Herbert Zelenko (D)
 . Sidney A. Fine (D), until January 2, 1956
 James C. Healey (D), from February 7, 1956
 . Isidore Dollinger (D)
 . Charles A. Buckley (D)
 . Paul A. Fino (R)
 . Ralph A. Gamble (R)
 . Ralph W. Gwinn (R)
 . Katharine St. George (R)
 . J. Ernest Wharton (R)
 . Leo W. O'Brien (D)
 . Dean P. Taylor (R)
 . Bernard W. Kearney (R)
 . Clarence E. Kilburn (R)
 . William R. Williams (R)
 . R. Walter Riehlman (R)
 . John Taber (R)
 . W. Sterling Cole (R)
 . Kenneth Keating (R)
 . Harold C. Ostertag (R)
 . William E. Miller (R)
 . Edmund P. Radwan (R)
 . John R. Pillion (R)
 . Daniel A. Reed (R)

North Carolina 
 . Herbert Covington Bonner (D)
 . Lawrence H. Fountain (D)
 . Graham Arthur Barden (D)
 . Harold D. Cooley (D)
 . Richard Thurmond Chatham (D)
 . Carl T. Durham (D)
 . Frank Ertel Carlyle (D)
 . Charles B. Deane (D)
 . Hugh Quincy Alexander (D)
 . Charles R. Jonas (R)
 . Woodrow W. Jones (D)
 . George A. Shuford (D)

North Dakota 
Both representatives were elected statewide on a general ticket.
 . Usher L. Burdick (R-NPL)
 . Otto Krueger (R)

Ohio 
 . Gordon H. Scherer (R)
 . William E. Hess (R)
 . Paul F. Schenck (R)
 . William Moore McCulloch (R)
 . Cliff Clevenger (R)
 . James G. Polk (D)
 . Clarence J. Brown (R)
 . Jackson Edward Betts (R)
 . Thomas L. Ashley (D)
 . Thomas A. Jenkins (R)
 . Oliver P. Bolton (R)
 . John Martin Vorys (R)
 . Albert David Baumhart Jr. (R)
 . William Hanes Ayres (R)
 . John E. Henderson (R)
 . Frank T. Bow (R)
 . J. Harry McGregor (R)
 . Wayne Hays (D)
 . Michael J. Kirwan (D)
 . Michael A. Feighan (D)
 . Charles Vanik (D)
 . Frances P. Bolton (R)
 . William Edwin Minshall Jr. (R)

Oklahoma 
 . Page Belcher (R)
 . Ed Edmondson (D)
 . Carl Albert (D)
 . Tom Steed (D)
 . John Jarman (D)
 . Victor Wickersham (D)

Oregon 
 . A. Walter Norblad (R)
 . Sam Coon (R)
 . Edith Green (D)
 . Harris Ellsworth (R)

Pennsylvania 
 . William A. Barrett (D)
 . William T. Granahan (D), until May 25, 1956
 Kathryn E. Granahan (D), from November 6, 1956
 . James A. Byrne (D)
 . Earl Chudoff (D)
 . William J. Green Jr. (D)
 . Hugh Scott (R)
 . Benjamin F. James (R)
 . Karl C. King (R)
 . Paul B. Dague (R)
 . Joseph L. Carrigg (R)
 . Dan Flood (D)
 . Ivor D. Fenton (R)
 . Samuel K. McConnell Jr. (R)
 . George M. Rhodes (D)
 . Francis E. Walter (D)
 . Walter M. Mumma (R)
 . Alvin Bush (R)
 . Richard M. Simpson (R)
 . James M. Quigley (D)
 . James E. Van Zandt (R)
 . Augustine B. Kelley (D)
 . John P. Saylor (R)
 . Leon H. Gavin (R)
 . Carroll D. Kearns (R)
 . Frank M. Clark (D)
 . Thomas E. Morgan (D)
 . James G. Fulton (R)
 . Herman P. Eberharter (D)
 . Robert J. Corbett (R)
 . Vera Buchanan (D), until November 26, 1955
 Elmer J. Holland (D), from January 24, 1956

Rhode Island 
 . Aime Forand (D)
 . John E. Fogarty (D)

South Carolina 
 . L. Mendel Rivers (D)
 . John J. Riley (D)
 . William Jennings Bryan Dorn (D)
 . Robert T. Ashmore (D)
 . James P. Richards (D)
 . John L. McMillan (D)

South Dakota 
 . Harold Lovre (R)
 . Ellis Yarnal Berry (R)

Tennessee 
 . B. Carroll Reece (R)
 . Howard Baker Sr. (R)
 . James B. Frazier Jr. (D)
 . Joe L. Evins (D)
 . Percy Priest (D), until October 12, 1956
 . Ross Bass (D)
 . Tom J. Murray (D)
 . Jere Cooper (D)
 . Clifford Davis (D)

Texas 
 . Martin Dies Jr. (D)
 . Wright Patman (D)
 . Jack Brooks (D)
 . Brady P. Gentry (D)
 . Sam Rayburn (D)
 . Bruce Alger (R)
 . Olin E. Teague (D)
 . John Dowdy (D)
 . Albert Thomas (D)
 . Clark W. Thompson (D)
 . Homer Thornberry (D)
 . William R. Poage (D)
 . Jim Wright (D)
 . Frank N. Ikard (D)
 . John J. Bell (D)
 . Joe M. Kilgore (D)
 . J. T. Rutherford (D)
 . Omar Burleson (D)
 . Walter E. Rogers (D)
 . George H. Mahon (D)
 . Paul J. Kilday (D)
 . O. C. Fisher (D)

Utah 
 . Henry Aldous Dixon (R)
 . William A. Dawson (R)

Vermont 
 . Winston L. Prouty (R)

Virginia 
 . Edward J. Robeson Jr. (D)
 . Porter Hardy Jr. (D)
 . J. Vaughan Gary (D)
 . Watkins Moorman Abbitt (D)
 . William M. Tuck (D)
 . Richard Harding Poff (R)
 . Burr Harrison (D)
 . Howard W. Smith (D)
 . W. Pat Jennings (D)
 . Joel Broyhill (R)

Washington 
 . Donald H. Magnuson (D)
 . Thomas Pelly (R)
 . Jack Westland (R)
 . Russell V. Mack (R)
 . Hal Holmes (R)
 . Walt Horan (R)
 . Thor C. Tollefson (R)

West Virginia 
 . Bob Mollohan (D)
 . Harley Orrin Staggers (D)
 . Cleveland M. Bailey (D)
 . Maurice G. Burnside (D)
 . Elizabeth Kee (D)
 . Robert Byrd (D)

Wisconsin 
 . Lawrence H. Smith (R)
 . Glenn Robert Davis (R)
 . Gardner R. Withrow (R)
 . Clement J. Zablocki (D)
 . Henry S. Reuss (D)
 . William Van Pelt (R)
 . Melvin Laird (R)
 . John W. Byrnes (R)
 . Lester Johnson (D)
 . Alvin O'Konski (R)

Wyoming 
 . Edwin Keith Thomson (R)

Non-voting members
 . Bob Bartlett (D)
 . Mary Elizabeth Pruett Farrington (R)
 . Antonio Fernós-Isern (PPD)

Changes in membership
The count below reflects changes from the beginning of this Congress.

Senate
 Replacements: 3
 Democratic: 1 net loss
 Independent Democratic: 1 net loss
 Republican: 2 net gain
 Deaths: 2
 Resignations: 1
 Interim appointments: 3
 Total seats with changes: 3

|-
| Oregon(3)
| nowrap  | Wayne Morse (I)
| style="front-size:80%" | Changed Political Parties April 30, 1955
| nowrap  | Wayne Morse (D)
| April 30, 1955
|-
| West Virginia(1)
| nowrap  | Harley M. Kilgore (D)
| style="font-size:80%" | Died February 28, 1956
| nowrap  | William Laird III (D)
| March 13, 1956
|-
| South Carolina(2)
| nowrap  | Strom Thurmond (ID)
| style="font-size:80%" | Resigned April 4, 1956, to trigger a contested primary as promised to voters
| nowrap  | Thomas A. Wofford (D)
| April 5, 1956
|-
| Kentucky(2)
| nowrap  | Alben W. Barkley (D)
| style="font-size:80%" | Died April 30, 1956
| nowrap  | Robert Humphreys (D)
| June 21, 1956
|-
| Kentucky(2)
| nowrap  | Robert Humphreys (D)
| style="font-size:80%" | Successor elected November 6, 1956
| nowrap  | John Sherman Cooper (R)
| November 7, 1956
|-
| South Carolina(2)
| nowrap  | Thomas A. Wofford (D)
| style="font-size:80%" | Successor elected November 6, 1956
| nowrap  | Strom Thurmond (D)
| November 7, 1956
|-
| West Virginia(1)
| nowrap  | William Laird III (D)
| style="font-size:80%" | Successor elected November 6, 1956
| nowrap  | Chapman Revercomb (R)
| November 7, 1956
|}

House of Representatives
 Replacements: 5
 Democratic: no net change
 Republican: no net change
 Deaths: 9
 Resignations: 3
 Total seats with changes: 12

|-
| 
| Vacant
| Rep. Dwight L. Rogers died during the previous congress after having been re-elected.Successor elected January 11, 1955.
|  nowrap | Paul Rogers (D)
| January 11, 1955

|-
| 
|  nowrap| John Dingell Sr. (D)
| Died September 19, 1955.Successor elected December 13, 1955.
|  nowrap | John Dingell (D)
| December 13, 1955

|-
| 
|  nowrap| Vera Buchanan (D)
| Died November 26, 1955.Successor elected January 24, 1956.
|  nowrap | Elmer J. Holland (D)
| January 24, 1956

|-
| 
|  nowrap| Sidney A. Fine (D)
| Resigned January 2, 1956.Successor elected February 7, 1956.
|  nowrap | James C. Healey (D)
| February 7, 1956

|-
| 
|  nowrap| Chauncey W. Reed (R)
| Died February 9, 1956Seat remained unfilled until next term.
| colspan=2 | Vacant

|-
| 
|  nowrap| William T. Granahan (D)
| Died May 25, 1956.Successor elected November 6, 1956.
|  nowrap | Kathryn E. Granahan (D)
| November 6, 1956

|-
| 
|  nowrap| John Carl Hinshaw (R)
| Died August 5, 1956.Seat remained unfilled until next term.
| colspan=2 | Vacant

|-
| 
|  nowrap| Percy Priest (D)
| Died October 12, 1956.Seat remained unfilled until next term.
| colspan=2 | Vacant

|-
| 
|  nowrap| Antonio M. Fernández (D)
| Died November 7, 1956.Seat remained unfilled until next term.
| colspan=2 | Vacant

|-
| 
|  nowrap| T. Millet Hand (R)
| Died December 26, 1956.Seat remained unfilled until next term.
| colspan=2 | Vacant

|-
| 
|  nowrap| Arthur George Klein (D)
| Resigned December 31, 1956 after being elected to the New York Supreme Court.Seat remained unfilled until next term.
| colspan=2 | Vacant

|-
| 
|  nowrap| Irwin D. Davidson (DL)
| Resigned December 31, 1956.Seat remained unfilled until next term.
| colspan=2 | Vacant

|}

Committees

Senate

 Agriculture and Forestry (Chairman: Allen J. Ellender; Ranking Member: George D. Aiken)
 Appropriations (Chairman: Carl Hayden; Ranking Member: Styles Bridges)
 Armed Services (Chairman: Richard B. Russell; Ranking Member: Styles Bridges)
 Banking and Currency (Chairman: J. William Fulbright; Ranking Member: Homer Capehart)
 Contribution Investigation (Select)
 District of Columbia (Chairman: Matthew M. Neely; Ranking Member: J. Glenn Beall)
 Finance (Chairman: Harry F. Byrd; Ranking Member: Eugene D. Millikin)
 Foreign Relations (Chairman: Walter F. George; Ranking Member: Alexander Wiley)
 Foreign Aid Program (Special)
 Government Operations (Chairman: John Little McClellan; Ranking Member: Joseph McCarthy)
 Interior and Insular Affairs (Chairman: James E. Murray; Ranking Member: Eugene D. Millikin)
 Interstate and Foreign Commerce (Chairman: Warren G. Magnuson; Ranking Member: John W. Bricker)
 Judiciary (Chairman: Harley M. Kilgore; Ranking Member: Alexander Wiley) 
 Labor and Public Welfare (Chairman: J. Lister Hill; Ranking Member: H. Alexander Smith)
 Political Activities, Lobbying and Campaign Contributions (Special)
 Post Office and Civil Service (Chairman: Olin D. Johnston; Ranking Member: Frank Carlson)
 Public Works (Chairman: Dennis Chavez; Ranking Member: Edward Martin)
 Rules and Administration (Chairman: Theodore F. Green; Ranking Member: William E. Jenner)
 Senate Reception Room (Special)
 Small Business (Select) (Chairman: John J. Sparkman)
 Whole

House of Representatives 
 Agriculture (Chairman: Harold D. Cooley; Ranking Member: Clifford R. Hope)
 Appropriations (Chairman: Clarence Cannon; Ranking Member: John Taber)
 Armed Services (Chairman: Carl Vinson; Ranking Member: Dewey J. Short)
 Banking and Currency (Chairman: Brent Spence; Ranking Member: Jesse P. Wolcott)
 Benefits for Dependents of Armed Services Veterans (Select) (Chairman: Porter Hardy Jr.)
 Defense Production
 District of Columbia (Chairman: John L. McMillan; Ranking Member: Sid Simpson)
 Education and Labor (Chairman: Graham A. Barden; Ranking Member: Samuel K. McConnell Jr.)
 Foreign Affairs (Chairman: James P. Richards; Ranking Member: Robert B. Chiperfield)
 Government Operations (Chairman: William L. Dawson; Ranking Member: Clare E. Hoffman)
 House Administration (Chairman: Omar Burleson; Ranking Member: Karl M. LeCompte)
 Investigate the Incorporation of the Baltic States into the U.S.S.R. (Select)
 Interior and Insular Affairs (Chairman: Clair Engle; Ranking Member: A.L. Miller)
 Interstate and Foreign Commerce (Chairman: J. Percy Priest; Ranking Member: Charles A. Wolverton)
 Judiciary (Chairman: Emanuel Celler; Ranking Member: Chauncey W. Reed then Kenneth B. Keating)
 Merchant Marine and Fisheries (Chairman: Herbert C. Bonner; Ranking Member: Thor C. Tollefson)
 Post Office and Civil Service (Chairman: Tom J. Murray; Ranking Member: Edward H. Rees)
 Public Works (Chairman: Charles A. Buckley; Ranking Member: George A. Dondero)
 Rules (Chairman: Howard W. Smith; Ranking Member: Leo E. Allen)
 Small Business (Select) (Chairman: Wright Patman)
 Standards of Official Conduct
 Un-American Activities (Chairman: Francis E. Walter; Ranking Member: Harold H. Velde)
 Veterans' Affairs (Chairman: Olin E. Teague; Ranking Member: Edith Nourse Rogers)
 Ways and Means (Chairman: Jere Cooper; Ranking Member: Daniel A. Reed)
 Whole

Joint committees

 Atomic Energy (Chairman: Sen. Clinton P. Anderson; Vice Chairman: Rep. Carl T. Durham)
 Conditions of Indian Tribes (Special)
 Construction of a Building for a Museum of History and Technology for the Smithsonian
 Defense Production
 Disposition of Executive Papers
 Economic
 Immigration and Nationality Policy (Chairman: Sen. Arthur V. Watkins)
 Legislative Budget
 The Library (Chairman: Omar Burleson; Vice Chairman: Theodore F. Green)
 Navajo-Hopi Indian Administration
 Printing (Chairman: Sen. Carl Hayden; Vice Chairman: Rep. Omar Burleson)
 Reduction of Nonessential Federal Expenditures (Chairman: Sen. Harry F. Byrd; Vice Chairman: Rep. Daniel A. Reed)
 Taxation (Chairman: Rep. Jere Cooper; Vice Chairman: Sen. Paul H. Douglas)

Employees

Legislative branch agency directors
 Architect of the Capitol: J. George Stewart
 Attending Physician of the United States Congress: George Calver
 Comptroller General of the United States: Joseph Campbell 
 Librarian of Congress: Lawrence Quincy Mumford 
 Public Printer of the United States: Raymond Blattenberger

Senate
 Chaplain: Frederick Brown Harris, Methodist
 Parliamentarian: Charles Watkins
 Secretary: Felton McLellan Johnston 
 Librarian: Richard D. Hupman
 Secretary for the Majority: Robert G. Baker
 Secretary for the Minority: J. Mark Trice
 Sergeant at Arms: Joseph C. Duke

House of Representatives
 Clerk: Ralph R. Roberts
 Sergeant at Arms: Zeake W. Johnson Jr.
 Doorkeeper: William Mosley "Fishbait" Miller
 Postmaster: H. H. Morris
 Parliamentarian: Lewis Deschler
 Reading Clerks: George J. Maurer (D) and Alney E. Chaffee (R)
 Chaplain: Bernard Braskamp (Presbyterian)

See also
 1954 United States elections (elections leading to this Congress)
 1954 United States Senate elections
 1954 United States House of Representatives elections
 1956 United States elections (elections during this Congress, leading to the next Congress)
 1956 United States presidential election
 1956 United States Senate elections
 1956 United States House of Representatives elections

Notes

References

External links
 Biographical Directory of the U.S. Congress
 U.S. House of Representatives: Congressional History
 U.S. Senate: Statistics and Lists